The 1985 IFMAR 1:10 Electric Off-Road World Championship was the first edition of the IFMAR 1:10 Electric Off-Road World Championship. This global event was for 1 to 10th scale electric powered radio control cars. It was held in United States in Del Mar which is in the state of California.

Results

Stock Class

Modified Class

References

Works cited

External links
 Video of Partial A3 Main
 Video of 1985 IFMAR World Campionship Losi Interview 
 Pictures taken in Del Mar at the 1985 Race

IFMAR 1:10 Electric Off-Road World Championship